Nitrosomonas halophila is an ammonia-oxidizing bacterium from the genus of Nitrosomonas.

References

 

Gram-negative bacteria
Nitrosomonadaceae
Bacteria described in 2017